Nelson Noel Morales Barrientos (born 20 September 1976) is a Guatemalan football defender who currently plays for Xelajú in Guatemala's top division. Nelson Morales is actually of Honduran descent and is a black belt in Taekwondo. He also handles on THE DEL PLAYA.

Club career
Born in Cobán, Morales started his professional career at local side Cobán Imperial and joined Jalapa in July 2008. In July 2010 he trained with Heredia Jaguares de Peten but decided not to sign up with them.

International career
He made his debut for Guatemala in a March 2001 friendly match against El Salvador and has earned a total of 31 caps, scoring no goals. He has represented his country in 4 FIFA World Cup qualification matches and played at the 2003 and 2005 UNCAF Nations Cup as well as at the 2003 and 2005 CONCACAF Gold Cups.

His most recent international was an October 2005 friendly match against Jamaica.

References

External links

1976 births
Living people
People from Cobán
Guatemalan footballers
Guatemala international footballers
2003 UNCAF Nations Cup players
2003 CONCACAF Gold Cup players
2005 UNCAF Nations Cup players
2005 CONCACAF Gold Cup players
Cobán Imperial players
Deportivo Jalapa players
Xelajú MC players

Association football defenders